William Kong sometimes credited as Bill Kong (born 1953) is a film producer known for his active role in the Hong Kong film industry and International co-production.  He is most famous for co-producing the Wuxia film Crouching Tiger, Hidden Dragon (2000), which earned him an Academy Award nomination for Best Picture as well as a BAFTA Award for Best Film.

He co-produced the historical drama war film The Flowers of War, directed by Zhang Yimou. Among his other films are Crossing Hennessy (2010) Rise of the Legend (2014), Monster Hunt (2015), Monster Hunt 2 (2018) and The Whistleblower (2019). Monster Hunt at the time of its release the largest grossing film in Chinese history. His producer credits include Zhang Yimou's Hero, House of Flying Daggers and Curse of the Golden Flower; Stephen Chow’s Kung Fu Hustle; and Ang Lee's Lust, Caution.

Bill Kong is the executive producer of the live-action remake of Disney’s 1998 animated movie Mulan (2020). He is the producer of the biographical musical drama film Anita about the late Cantopop star Anita Mui.

References

External links

Bill Kong on Blood

1953 births
Living people
Filmmakers who won the Best Foreign Language Film BAFTA Award